Corbari (also known as Mission Corbari) is a 1970 Italian war-drama film written and directed by  Valentino Orsini. It is based on real life events of Italian partisan Silvio Corbari.

Cast 
Giuliano Gemma: Silvio Corbari 
Tina Aumont: Ines
Antonio Piovanelli:  Adriano Casadei 
Frank Wolff: Ulianov
Vittorio Duse: Martino
Alessandro Haber

References

External links

1970 films
1970s war drama films
1970s biographical drama films
Italian war drama films
Italian biographical drama films
Films directed by Valentino Orsini
Italian Campaign of World War II films
World War II films based on actual events
Films scored by Benedetto Ghiglia
1970 drama films
Italian World War II films
1970s Italian-language films
1970s Italian films
Films about Italian resistance movement